Them Clones is an Indian rock band, formed sometime in August 2000 in New Delhi at drummer Surojit Dev's bedroom.

The band started in a bedroom in South Delhi’s RK Puram area, resonating with drum loops and guitar riffs from where they were kicked out due to "excessive noise". The search for a new jam pad led them to other neighbourhoods, where they attempted covers of popular rock and grunge classics followed by the release of their own singles. They began by touring the Delhi University music scene and won many and noted competitions.
 
The band members were the "chosen ones" at the Channel [V] LaunchPad in 2005 and were voted as the 'Best Band' at Jack Daniel's Rock Awards in 2006 and 2007. In 2007, they were 2nd runners up at the Channel [V] AMP Big Break All Asia. They followed this up at The Jack Daniel's Rock Awards 2009 by winning 'Best Song', 'Best Vocalist' and 'Best Drummer' awards. 'My life' also was awarded the Best Song in the 'Rock Category' at IMA Awards.

October 2009 witnessed their debut album  Love.Hate.Heroes' with Counter Culture Records / EMI  Records.
Their most popular songs are ‘My Life’, ‘Awaken’, ‘Zephyretta’, ‘Zoopertrip’, ‘In The Name of God’, ‘Sindrome’, ‘Wait For Me’, 'The Bomb Song' and 'Mediocre'.

Post their debut album 'Love.Hate.Heroes' in 2009, the Clones dropped 'Singles' in 2011 'All About a Heart Break' and 'Jealousy' as well as its video followed with 'Season 2 Singles' in 2013 with new hits 'Mediocre' and 'Speak when i'm gone'. They started their own festival 'Clonefest' in 2011 which happens once a year annually in New Delhi.

Influence
Them Clones have often cited Rage Against the Machine, Coldplay, Smashing Pumpkins, Alice In Chains and Pearl Jam as their major influencers.

See also
Indian rock
Kryptos (band)
Bhayanak Maut
Nicotine (band)
Inner Sanctum (band)
Scribe (band)
Demonic Resurrection

References

External links 
Official website
Decade decoded (The Hindu)

Indian rock music groups
Musical groups established in 2000